John of Beverley (died 7 May 721) was an English bishop active in the kingdom of Northumbria. He was the bishop of Hexham and then the bishop of York, which was the most important religious designation in the area. He went on to found the town of Beverley by building the first structure there, a monastery. John was associated with miracles during and after his lifetime, and was canonised a saint by the Catholic Church in 1037.

Life
John was said to have been born of noble parents at Harpham, in the East Riding of Yorkshire, He is said to have received his education at Canterbury under Adrian, and not Oxford as per some sources. However, all these statements are first recorded after his canonization in 1037, and may not be reliable. He was for a time a member of the Whitby community, under St Hilda, a fact recorded by his friend Bede. He won renown as a preacher, displaying marked erudition in expounding Scripture.

In 687 he was consecrated bishop of Hexham by Theodore of Tarsus, Archbishop of Canterbury (602–690), and in 705 was promoted to the bishopric of York. Of his new activity little is known beyond that he was diligent in visitation, considerate towards the poor, and attentive to the training of students whom he maintained under his personal charge. He ordained Bede as a deacon and as a priest. He resigned perhaps about 717 and retired to a monastery which he had founded at Beverley, where he died on 7 May 721.

Veneration
John was canonised in 1037, and his feast is celebrated annually on 7 May. His translation is also celebrated on 25 October in the Catholic Church. Many miracles of healing are ascribed to John, whose pupils were numerous and devoted to him, and the popularity of his cult was a major factor in the prosperity of Beverley during the Middle Ages. He was celebrated for his scholarship as well as for his virtues. Around 1066, Folcard was commissioned to write a Life of John. An account of John's miracles was written by William Ketel in the 11th or 12th century which contains the first mention of King Æthelstan's visit to Beverley.

The earliest existing mention of John's banner is in 1138 when Thurstan incorporated it into the standard which gave its name to the Battle of the Standard. By 1266 it was accepted that when levies were made in Yorkshire for the royal army, it was sufficient for Beverley to send one man with the banner of John. In 1292 a new shrine was commissioned. An extant contract between Roger de Faringdon and the canons of Beverley Minster states:

For a silver-gilt shrine, made from gold and silver supplied by the Chapter, 5ft long, 1ft wide. Of proportionate height, beautiful, and adorned with plates and columns in architectural style with figures everywhere of size and number as the Chapter determine, and canopies and pinnacles before and behind, and other proper ornaments. Roger to remake any figure at the whim of The Chapter. The pay to be silver equal to the weight used before gilding. Roger may not undertake any other work before completion.

Edward I was a devotee of John and furthered the cult. In 1295 Edward established a chantry in Beverley Minster in the saint's honour. In 1301, he gave 50 marks towards the building of the shrine and diverted half of a fine owed by the town to the same purpose and ceded the remaining half.

On 25 October 1307 John's relics were translated to the new tomb.
Edward I visited the Minster in 1296, 1297, and 1300 on his way north to fight with the Scottish and took the banner of John to aid him. Edward II, Edward III, and Henry IV also used the banner in military campaigns.

During the Middle Ages his name was also attached to the legend of a hermit who commits grave sins but nonetheless enjoys God's grace. This text survives in the Dutch chapbook Historie van Jan van Beverley, printed by Thomas van der Noot in Brussels in c.1512.

Henry V gave the credit for his victory at the Battle of Agincourt to the miraculous intervention of John, the battle having been fought on the anniversary of John's translation. On the day of the battle, blood and oil were seen running from the tomb. Henry made John one of the patrons of the royal household and ordered that his feast was to be celebrated throughout England. Henry and his queen came to Beverley in 1420 to make offerings at the saint's shrine.

In 1541, the shrine was destroyed on the orders of Henry VIII as part of the English Reformation. Its contents disappeared from records. In 1664, workmen discovered a vault under the floor of the minster's nave. Encased in lead, were found ashes, six beads, three great brass pins and four large iron nails. The lead had the following inscription:

In the year from the incarnation of our Lord, 1188, this church was burnt in the month of September, the night after the feast of St Matthew the Apostle and in the year 1197, the 6th of the ides of March, there was an inquisition made of the relics of the Blessed John in this place, and these bones were found in the east part of this sepulchre, and redeposited; dust mixed with mortar was found likewise and re-interred.

In 1738, when the present minster floor was laid, the same relics were dug up and replaced in the same position with an arched brick vault over them. This was covered by a marble slab, similar to others in the nave. On the roof of the church, over the tomb, Reliquas beati Johanis Beverlacenic his undicat.

The inscription on the tomb now reads:

HERE LIES THE BODY OF SAINT JOHN OF BEVERLEYFOUNDER OF THIS CHURCH BISHOP OF HEXHAM AD 687–705 BISHOP OF YORK A.D. 705–718 HE WAS BORN AT HARPHAM AND DIED AT BEVERLEY AD 721

In recent times, the feast of St John has been marked in Beverley in two ways. On the Thursday nearest 7 May the choir and members of the congregation of Beverley Minster go the church at Harpham and process to the well. The well is decorated (before the event) with flowers. After singing an anthem and praying, the procession returns to the church for choral evensong.

On the Sunday nearest 7 May the civic dignitaries process in full regalia with mace bearers to the minster. The procession enters by the Great West Door. During the following service, children from Harpham present primroses gathered from the woods around the village. The flowers are placed around John's tomb.

Julian of Norwich and John Fisher were devotees of John of Beverley.

Works
The following works, none of which now survives, are ascribed to John by John Bale:

 (an exposition of Luke)

.

Citations

Further reading
Life by Folcard, based on Bede, in Acta Sanctorum. Bolland.
Pamela Hopkins, St John of Beverley Hallgarth Publishing, Beverley 1999 
James Raine, Fasti eboracenses (1863).
G. J. Boekenoogen (ed.), Historie van Jan van Beverley (Nederlandsche Volksboeken VI), Leiden: Brill 1903.
Alan R. Deighton, "The Sins of Saint John of Beverley: The Case of the Dutch Volksboek Jan van Beverley", Leuvense Bijdragen 82 (1993) 227–246.
Susan E. Wilson, The Life and After-Life of St John of Beverley: The Evolution of the Cult of an Anglo-Saxon Saint, Aldershot: Ashgate 2006.

External links

Butler, Alban. "The Lives or the Fathers, Martyrs and Other Principal Saints", Vol.V, D. & J. Sadlier, & Company, 1864
 

721 deaths
Northumbrian saints
Bishops of Hexham
Bishops of York
People from Beverley
7th-century English bishops
8th-century English bishops
Yorkshire saints
8th-century Christian saints
7th-century Christian saints
Year of birth unknown
8th-century English writers
8th-century Latin writers